The N5 is a road in Belgium connecting the small ring in Brussels and Philippeville via Charleroi (commonly named  till the ring of Charleroi).

This road could be one of the deadliest of the country. 
This is not only due to the traffic density and the old fashioned road safety features, but also because many country roads are joining onto a high speed lane, namely the tractors harvesting sugar beet.

It has also been part of the history of Belgium in the Battle of Waterloo, during which the Imperial French Army went through this path to join the battlefield of Quatre-Bras/Ligny

References

See also
 Transport in Belgium

005